This is the list of ARIA Club Chart number-one hits in 2008, compiled by the Australian Recording Industry Association (ARIA) from weekly DJ reports.

2008

Number-one artists

See also
ARIA Charts
List of number-one singles of 2008 (Australia)
List of number-one albums of 2008 (Australia)
2008 in music

References

2008 Club
Australia Club Chart
2008 in Australian music